Red Skin Eclipse is the second full-length album by British industrial/alternative band Terminal Power Company. Released by Beggars Banquet Records, the album was recorded in November and December 1992 at Rich Bitch Studios and was produced and mixed by Justin Broadrick. Also involved were producer Adrian Sherwood who mixed the track "Juggernaut" and Paul Kendall who mixed part of the song "Blanket Drill Doll".

Track listing
 "Juggernaut" - 4:01
 "Red Skin" - 3:42
 "Splinterpsyche" - 3:27
 "The Sprawl" - 7:23
 "Painkiller" - 3:43
 "Mouth Like a Scar" - 3:57
 "A.G.G.R.O." - 4:38
 "White Light" - 4:00
 "Blanket Drill Doll" - 12:26

Personnel
Paul Aspel
John Roome

References

External links
 Rich Bitch Studios

1993 albums
Beggars Banquet Records albums